The LG G Pad 10.1 (also known as LG G Tab 10.1) is a 10.1-inch Android-based tablet computer produced and marketed by LG Electronics. It belongs to the LG G series, and was announced on 13 May 2014 along with the G Pad 8.0, and G Pad 7.0. It is one of LG's new tablet-size variants aimed to compete directly with the Samsung Galaxy Tab 4 series.

History 
The G Pad 10.1 was first announced on 13 May 2014. It was officially unveiled at the MedPI tradeshow in Monaco. It was released in July 2014.

Features
The G Pad 10.1 was released with Android 4.4.2 Kitkat. LG has customized the interface with its Optimus UI software. As well as apps from Google, including Google Play, Gmail and YouTube, it has access to LG apps such as QPair, QSlide, KnockOn, and Slide Aside.

The G Pad 10.1 is available in a WiFi-only, 3G & Wi-Fi, and 4G/LTE & WiFi variants. Internal storage is 16 GB, with a microSDXC card slot for expansion. It has a 10.1-inch IPS LCD screen with a resolution of 1280x800 pixel. It also features a  front camera without flash and  rear-facing camera. It also has the ability to record HD videos.

References

G Pad 10.1
Android (operating system) devices
Tablet computers
Tablet computers introduced in 2014